The Tibetan eye chart is a tool allegedly developed by Tibetan monks. According to some authors, it can be used to train the muscles and nerves of the optical system, correcting visual problems. However, the International Orthoptic Association has found no scientific evidence of the effectiveness  of this treatment.

See also

Eye chart

References

Tibetan medicine
Eye care